The Aerial Phenomena Research Organization (APRO) was a UFO research group started in January 1952 by Jim and Coral Lorenzen, of Sturgeon Bay, Wisconsin.

The group was based in Tucson, Arizona after 1960. APRO had many state branches, it remained active until late 1988.

APRO stressed scientific field investigations, and had a large staff of consulting Ph.D. scientists. A notable example was James E. McDonald of the University of Arizona, a well-known atmospheric physicist, and perhaps the leading scientific UFO researcher of his time. Another was James Harder of the University of California, Berkeley, a civil and hydraulic engineering professor, who acted as director of research from 1969-1982. McDonald and Harder were among six scientists who testified about UFOs before the U.S. House of Representatives Committee on Science and Astronautics on July 29, 1968, when they sponsored a one-day symposium on the subject.

Astronomer J. Allen Hynek cited APRO and NICAP as the two best civilian UFO groups of their time, consisting largely of sober, serious minded people capable of valuable contributions to the subject. 

In 1969, a sizable portion of APRO's membership elected to form a new group named the "Midwest UFO Network"; this soon expanded and became the Mutual UFO Network (MUFON), still active today.

References

External links
History of the APRO
History of MUFON (with references to APRO)

1952 establishments in Wisconsin
1988 disestablishments in Arizona
Defunct organizations based in Arizona
Organizations based in Tucson, Arizona
Organizations disestablished in 1988
Organizations established in 1952
Research organizations in the United States
UFO organizations
UFO culture in the United States